The  was held on 30 December 2019.

Presents 

 Tao Tsuchiya
 Shinichiro Azumi (TBS Announcer)

Winners

Grand Prix
Foorin – Paprika
 Artist: Foorin
 Lyrics: Kenshi Yonezu
 Composition & arranger: Kenshi Yonezu
 Producer: Kenshi Yonezu

Excellent Work Awards
Little Glee Monster – ECHO
Daichi Miura – Katasumi
 Keyakizaka46 – Kuroi Hitsuji
AKB48 – Sustainable
Junretsu – Junretsu no Happy Birthday
Nogizaka46 – Sing Out!
Kiyoshi Hikawa – Daijoubu
Hinatazaka46 – Doremisolatido
DA PUMP – P.A.R.T.Y. ~Universe Festival~
Foorin – Paprika

Album of the Year
The Yellow Monkey – 9999

Excellence Album Award
Eikichi Yazawa – Itsuka, Sono Hi ga Kuru Hi made…
Aimyon – Momentary Sixth Sense
King Gnu – Sympa
Rimi Natsukawa – Churasa Kanasa

Special Award
Masaki Suda
Mariya Takeuchi
Kenshi Yonezu

Best Vocal Performance
Yukino Ichikawa

Best New Artist
Beyooooonds

New Artist Awards
Ryouta Kaizou
Leon Niihama
BEYOOOOONDS
Ryuusei

Composition Award
Takafumi Iwasaki (Kiyoshi Hikawa – "Genkai Toppa×Survivor")

Lyrics Award
Shinichi Ishihara (Takeshi Matsubara – "Saihoku Cinema" / Yukino Ichikawa – "Yuki Renge")

Arrangement Award
Takuya Ōhashi, Shintarō Tokita (Sukima Switch – "Seishun")

Planning Award
Hiroko Moriguchi – Gundam Song Covers
Kaho Takada – Daikoukai 2020 ~Koi yori Suki ja, Dame desuka? ver.~
Naomi Chiaki – Bigin
Ran Itō – My Bouquet
Jaejoong – Love Covers
Golden Bomber – Reiwa

Japan Composer’s Association Award
Midori Oka

Achievement Award
Katsuko Kanai
Mari Sono
Munetaka Hakamada
Billy BanBan

Lifetime Achievement Award
Mieko Arima
Yuya Uchida
Kazuya Senke
Kenichi Hagiwara

References 

2019
2019 music awards
2019 in Japanese music